Bert Metzger (January 31, 1909 – March 7, 1986) was an American football player.

A ,  guard from Chicago, Metzger played at the University of Notre Dame and was nicknamed the "watch-charm guard" because of his relatively small size.  Metzger played a key role on the Fighting Irish teams that won national championships in 1929 and 1930, and he was named a consensus All-American in 1930.  Coach Knute Rockne said that Metzger was the best guard he had ever seen.

After his football career ended, Metzger worked as an executive at Bowman-Dean Foods.  He was inducted into the College Football Hall of Fame in 1982.

References

External links
 Notre Dame profile
 
 

1909 births
1986 deaths
American football guards
Notre Dame Fighting Irish football players
All-American college football players
College Football Hall of Fame inductees
Players of American football from Chicago